Shangr-La is an album by the saxophonist Sonny Stitt featuring the organist Don Patterson recorded in 1964 and released on the Prestige label.

Reception

Allmusic awarded the album three stars, writing, "Shangri-La doesn't particularly stand out from other, similar albums he made at the time with organ, but it's a respectable set with both uptempo swingers and ballads."

Track listing 
All compositions by Sonny Stitt except as noted.
 "My New Baby" - 7:21     
 "Misty" (Erroll Garner, Johnny Burke) - 4:34     
 "Soul Food" - 7:51     
 "Shangri-La" (Matty Malneck, Robert Maxwell, Carl Sigman) - 4:44     
 "Mama Don't Allow" (Cow Cow Davenport) - 5:54     
 "The Eternal One" - 5:49

Personnel 
Sonny Stitt - tenor saxophone - vocal track 5
Don Patterson - electronic organ
Billy James - drums

References 

1964 albums
Prestige Records albums
Sonny Stitt albums
Albums produced by Ozzie Cadena
Albums recorded at Van Gelder Studio